G Lake is a lake located west of Higgins Bay, New York. Fish species present in the lake are brook trout, and brown trout. There is carry down off trail from G Lake Road along the west shore. The name is derived from the shape of the body of water, which forms something that resembles a letter “G".

Description
There are a few primitive campsites located by the lake. From the summer parking near the barrier, it’s less than half a mile to access the water and campsites. Located here is a clearing, which was the site of a former camp which was privately owned. The remains of a dam is located at the outlet of the lake.

Outlet creek
G Lake Outlet drains G Lake and flows northwest before emptying into the South Branch West Canada Creek.

References

Lakes of New York (state)
Lakes of Hamilton County, New York